The Leader of the Opposition in Gujarat Legislative Assembly is the official leader of principal opposition party in assembly. The leader of opposition is given rank of cabinet minister and is entitled to draw monthly salary and other perks of the same Rank.

The post is vacant since 8 December 2022 since no opposition party has even 10% of the total seats of the house.

Leaders of the Opposition

References

 
Lists of people from Gujarat
Gujarat Legislative Assembly